Kutak-e Jajji Aqa (also Romanized as Kūtak-e Jājjī Āqā; also known as Kūrtak-e Ḩājj Āqā, Kūtak-e Ḩāj Āqā, and Kūtak-e Ḩājj Āqā) is a village in Dodangeh Rural District, in the Central District of Behbahan County, Khuzestan Province, Iran. At the 2006 census, its population was 164, in 28 families.

References 

Populated places in Behbahan County